Moygownagh or Moygawnagh is a civil parish and village in the barony of Tyrawley, County Mayo, Ireland. Moygownagh borders the parishes of Kilfian, and Crossmolina.

The parish is on the R315 Crossmolina to Ballycastle road. The local community centre acts as a meeting place and sporting venue in the area.

History

The story of how the parish got its name is told in the 7th century Life of St. Cormac, taken from McFirbis. It relates how St. Cormac while on a journey, came to the place called Moygownagh, where he met St. Daria who was abbess of a nunnery there. She received him so hospitably that on his departure he blessed her and her place of habitation, and prayed that Moygownagh would abound in cows and herds. His prayers were answered, and from then on the place was known as Mag Gamhnach, which means 'plain of the cows with calves'.

Although there is no monument in the parish erected in to St. Daria, St. Cormac gives his name to the church. It is thought that St. Daire's convent was situated where the old cemetery now stands.

In ancient times, Moygownagh, most of Kilfian and a small part of Crossmolina formed the territory known as Bredach.

There was a Protestant church near Garranard Post Office which itself was the parson's residence. The stones remaining in the old Protestant church were used in the foundation of the present parochial house. The present church was built in 1846 by Father James McNamera. It is situated in Ardvarney townland, once owned by a landlord called Stackpole.

In Samuel Lewis's Topographical Dictionary of Ireland, published in 1837, the area is described as:
MAGANAUGH, or MOYGOWNAGH, a parish, in the barony of Tyrawley, county of Mayo, and province of Connaught, 7 miles (S.W.) from Killala, on the road from Crossmolina to Ballycastle; containing 1,981 inhabitants. This parish is situated on the river Awenmore, and comprises 4100 statute acres; the land is light, chiefly under tillage, with some pasture, and great quantities of bog and mountain; limestone abounds.

The principal seats are Belleville, the residence of Capt. W. Orme; Glenmore, of W. Orme, Esq.; and Stonehall, of T. Knox, Esq. It is a vicarage, in the diocese of Killala, forming part of the union of Crossmolina; the rectory is partly appropriate to the precentorship of Killala, and partly to the vicars choral of Christchurch, Dublin. The tithes amount to £110, of which £35.10 is payable to the vicars choral, £19.10 to the precentor, and £55 to the vicar. The R.C. parish is co-extensive with that of the Established Church; the chapel is small and in bad repair. About 70 children are educated in a public and about 10 in a private school.

Church

Samuel Lewis, writing in the 1830s, spoke of the "R.C. Chapel in Magaunagh" as being "small and in bad repair". This church stood on the road-side about halfway between the present church gate and Mitchells shop. A holy water stoup belonging to this church was preserved beside it for many years.

The present church was built in 1846 and it is situated in Ardvarney townland. The Griffith Valuation (1856) records that the "R.C. chapel and yard" were leased from Andrew Brown, being 5 roods in area and having a valuation of £15-15-0, but exempt from taxes or rates.

There was a stone placed over the entrance of the church which bore the following inscription: "This is the house of God and Gate of Heaven. Erected to the greater glory of God, A.D. 1846". After a porch was erected about 1937, this stone became hidden from view. It was removed in 1973 and inserted in the wall near the priest's graves. Extensive reconstruction and alteration works were carried out at this time also by Fr. Michael Gilroy. The reason for the porch being erected in 1937 was that the door faced the prevailing wind and around that time a severe storm blew in the door and damaged the roof.

There is a relatively new graveyard behind Moygownagh church. The old Moygownagh cemetery is about half a mile south-west of Moygownagh town.  The short driveway to the cemetery is on the west side of the Crossmolina road behind iron gates.

Glenmore House

Glenmore House in the parish of Moygownagh was known locally as the 'Big House' or the Landlords house. It was built in 1790 with the stones quarried from the nearby wood,. It was owned at the time by William Knox Orme. In 1853, the house and lands were purchased by Fetherstonehaugh. He remained as Landlord until 1930.

During this time, the Land Commission allotted most of the lands to the tenants. Major Aldridge bought the house and remaining lands in 1930.

When Major Aldridge sold the estate, he moved to Mount Falcon, near Ballina. He had a great interest in local history and he collected information and stories for the Folklore Commission.

After Major Aldridge came Mr. Brennan, Mr Hegarty, Captain Hunt, Mr. Latta, Sir John Riss and Mr Somers. Mr Somers sold the estate to Dr. Loftus in 1978. He owned it during his term as President of the G.A.A. Dr. Loftus sold the house and lands to a Mr. Begot in 1989.

There was a holy well situated in the vicinity of the Big House. Many people came to pray at the well. Folklore has it that the landlord was displeased with the practice and the steward ordered the workers to fill the well with clay. They refused to obey his order so he took the spade himself and threw in a spadeful of soil. The men then completed the job. The steward became insane shortly afterward.

References

Civil parishes of County Mayo
Towns and villages in County Mayo